William John Christopher Vassall (20 September 1924 – 18 November 1996) was a British civil servant who spied for the Soviet Union, allegedly under pressure of blackmail, from 1954 until his arrest in 1962. Although operating only at a junior level, he was able to provide details of naval technology which were crucial to the modernising of the Soviet Navy. He was sentenced to eighteen years' imprisonment, and was released in 1972, after having served ten. The Vassall scandal greatly embarrassed the Macmillan government, but was soon eclipsed by the more dramatic Profumo affair.

Early life
Born in 1924 and known throughout his life as John Vassall, he was the son of William Vassall, chaplain at St Bartholomew's Hospital, London, and Mabel Andrea Sellicks, a nurse at the same hospital. He was educated at Monmouth School. During the Second World War he worked as a photographer for the Royal Air Force. After the war, in 1948, he became a clerk (clerical officer) at the Admiralty.

Although his father was an Anglican priest, his mother converted to Roman Catholicism, a decision that led to tensions within their marriage. Vassall himself converted to Catholicism in 1953.

Spying career
In 1952, Vassall was appointed, still as a clerical officer, to the staff of the Naval Attaché at the British embassy in Moscow. There, he said later, he found himself socially isolated by the snobberies and class hierarchies of diplomatic life, his loneliness further exacerbated by his homosexuality, which was still illegal in both Britain and the Soviet Union at the time. He became acquainted with a Pole named Michalski, who worked for the Embassy, and who introduced him to the homosexual underworld of Moscow. In 1954, he was invited to a party, where he was encouraged to become extremely drunk, and where he was photographed in compromising positions with several men.

The party, arranged by the KGB, had been a classic "honeytrap". The Soviets used the photographs to blackmail Vassall into working for them as a spy, initially in the Moscow embassy, and later in London, following his return there in June 1956. He returned to the Admiralty, where he worked first in the Naval Intelligence Division, and then, as the clerical officer assistant to the Private Secretary, in the Private Office of Tam Galbraith, a Conservative Party politician and Civil Lord of the Admiralty. At the time of his arrest he was working in Military Branch II. During his espionage career, Vassall provided the Soviets with several thousand classified documents, including information on British radar, torpedoes, and anti-submarine equipment. His obituary-writer in The Times commented that "Vassall was never more than a low-level functionary, but there was nothing low-level about the damage he was able to inflict". Similarly, Chapman Pincher regarded Vassall as "the classic example of the spy who, while of lowly rank, can inflict enormous damage because of the excellence of his access to secret information". Pincher continued: "I am in no doubt that the recruitment and running of Vassall was a major triumph for the KGB. He provided information of the highest value to the Soviet defence chiefs in their successful drive to expand and modernise the Red Navy."

Rebecca West, in her book The New Meaning of Treason (1964) demurred from the notion that Vassall was "a weak and silly little man ... This was unlikely to be the correct view of a man who for seven years had carried on an occupation [espionage] demanding unremitting industry in a skilled craft carried on in clandestine conditions, an endless capacity for dissimulation, and sustained contempt for personal danger." West termed him, rather, "a professional spy, working within the conventions of his profession, [who] had no more been blackmailed into the exercise of his profession than any lawyer". West suggested that the claim of blackmail was "putting up a smoke-screen to conceal what he had done." Observing that Vassall had been well paid by the Soviets for his spying, West wrote: "The drunken party may have taken place, but it was probably engineered so that Vassall might refer to it should his treachery ever be discovered ... Only a very stupid and helpless man would have succumbed [to a blackmail threat], and Vassall was not stupid; he was extremely resourceful."

Exposure
Vassall was identified as a potential spy after Anatoliy Golitsyn, a senior member of the KGB, defected to the United States in 1961. The KGB, worried that Vassall would be exposed, ordered him to cease operations until further notice. Another defector, Yuri Nosenko, added to the case against Vassall, but doubts about the evidence provided by both Golitsyn and Nosenko persisted. Documents and microdots provided by the 1960 Polish defector Michal Goleniewski may also have contributed to the case against him. Vassall soon resumed his work. It had become obvious to his colleagues that Vassall had some other source of income, for he moved to an expensive flat in Dolphin Square, took foreign holidays, and was said to own 36 Savile Row suits. His annual expenditure was later estimated at about £3,000, when his official salary was £750; he explained the discrepancy by stating that he had an inheritance from a distant relative.

On 12 September 1962, Vassall was arrested and charged with spying. He made a full confession, and directed detectives to the cameras and films concealed in his flat. The documents that he admitted to stealing did not account for everything believed to have been taken, however, which led to speculation that there was another spy still operating in the Admiralty. Some have suggested that Vassall was deliberately sacrificed by the KGB in an attempt to protect the other (possibly more senior) spy. In October, Vassall was sentenced to 18 years in jail. While in Wormwood Scrubs prison, Vassall became acquainted with neo-Nazi Colin Jordan who later wrote to Prime Minister Harold Macmillan claiming that, courtesy of Vassall, he had evidence of 'a network of homosexual politicians'. The Security Service MI5 interviewed both Vassall and Jordan and dismissed the claims.

The scandal caused the Macmillan government considerable embarrassment, erupting as it did at the height of the Cold War, only a year before the still-more dramatic revelations of the Profumo affair. The Vassall Tribunal was held to inquire into whether the failure to detect Vassall earlier amounted to a failure of intelligence, as many British newspapers had claimed. It also investigated suggestions that the close relations between Vassall and Tam Galbraith had been improper. However, in its conclusions the tribunal found no evidence for impropriety, and largely exonerated the government.

Later years
Vassall served ten years of his sentence, in Wormwood Scrubs, Maidstone and Durham prisons.  He was befriended in prison by social reformer Lord Longford. He was eventually released on parole in October 1972.

He then wrote a memoir, published in 1975 as Vassall: the autobiography of a spy. He described it as "a kind of self-justification, not as regards my espionage activities, but as regards my position as a human being, and, perhaps, my ability to make and keep friends in all walks of life". Rex Winsbury called the book "[a] cross between Jennifer's Diary [the society column of Queen magazine] and James Bond, ... bewildering both for Vassall's own transparent naivety and social snobbism, ... and for the equally transparent naivety of the British Foreign Office and security forces". Hungarian émigré George Mikes similarly concluded that it was Vassall's "vanity, his childish snobbery, his devouring ambition and complete lack of humour that pushed him so deep into the quagmire".

Vassall subsequently changed his surname to Phillips, settled in St John's Wood, London, and worked quietly as an administrator at the British Records Association, and for a firm of solicitors in Gray's Inn. He died after suffering a heart attack on a London bus in November 1996: it was not until nearly three weeks later that the press became aware of his death.

Media portrayals
The suggestion of an improper relationship between Vassall and Tam Galbraith inspired a memorable sketch on the satirical BBC programme That Was the Week That Was, which was broadcast in 1963, in which Lance Percival played a senior civil servant detecting sexual innuendo in such conventional pleasantries as the salutation "My Dear Vassall" at the beginning of a letter.

In 1980 the BBC broadcast a docudrama about the affair, in which Vassall was played by John Normington as "weak, vain and keen to be thought a gentleman".

See also
British political scandals

References

Citations

Sources

External links
  (podcast and transcript)
  (portrait in oils)

1924 births
1996 deaths
British people convicted of spying for the Soviet Union
British spies for the Soviet Union
Private secretaries in the British Civil Service
English LGBT people
People educated at Monmouth School for Boys
British expatriates in the Soviet Union
1962 in British politics
British LGBT civil servants
Royal Air Force personnel of World War II
Civil servants in the Admiralty
LGBT history in the United Kingdom
20th-century LGBT people